Giorgio Sonnino (17 February 1844 – 29 November 1921) was a senator of the Kingdom of Italy. He was born at Alexandria, Egypt, and died in Rome. He was a Jew, but converted to Anglicanism, the faith of his Welsh wife.

Italian Anglicans
Converts to Anglicanism from Judaism
Jewish Italian politicians
Italian politicians
People of Egyptian-Jewish descent
1844 births
1921 deaths